Lungfish is an American rock band formed in 1987 in Baltimore, Maryland. All of their music has been released by the Washington, D.C. punk label Dischord, except for their first album.

History
As of 2005, Lungfish's lineup consisted of Daniel Higgs (vocals, occasional guitar), Asa Osborne (guitar), Sean Meadows (bass), and Mitchell Feldstein (drums). Two previous bass players were John Chriest and Nathan Bell.

Related projects
Daniel Higgs sang in the 1980s hardcore/punk band Reptile House, and has released numerous solo works under his own name and also Cone of Light. He has recently made numerous solo performances, usually with the long-necked banjo and jaw harp (his recent albums document this as well: 2006's Ancestral Songs and 2007's Metempsychotic Melodies). In 2011, Higgs also collaborated with Swedish band Skull Defekts on the album Peer Amid (Thrill Jockey). Since 2015, Higgs has released two full-length albums in Fountainsun, a duo with Fumie Ishii.

Asa Osborne has released a CD and 7-inch with Charles Brohawn of The Tinklers under the name Tear Jerks. Osborne also released an album on Dischord in 2002 with Daniel Higgs under the name The Pupils. In early 2008, the record label Holy Mountain announced a new solo project by Osborne called Zomes.

Sean Meadows has played in numerous bands including June of 44, The Sonora Pine, and many lesser-known bands from the Chattanooga, Tennessee music scene.

Mitchell Feldstein has published three volumes of prose/poetry: Hurl on Apathy Press, Teen Cardinal on Shattered Wig Press, and Even Change on Paradigm Publishing. He also played the drums with Arbouretum. In 2019 a cassette recording of Feldstein's spoken word with musical backdrops, Pretty Boss, was released on Flag Day Recordings.

Nathan Bell played bass on Kogumaza's Kолокол (2014), which featured the song "Ursids", which was used as a double-A-sided single with the band Hookworms. Bell has also worked with David Heumann from Arboureteum as Human Bell.

Discography

Albums
 Necklace of Heads (1990)
 Talking Songs for Walking (1992)
 Rainbows from Atoms (1993)
 Pass and Stow (1994)
 Sound in Time (1996)
 Indivisible (1997)
 Artificial Horizon (1998)
 The Unanimous Hour (1999)
 Necrophones (2000)
 Love Is Love (2003)
 Feral Hymns (2005)
 A.C.R. 1999 (2012)

Singles and compilation appearances
 1990: "Nothing Is Easy" on Simple Machines Records#1 "Wedge" 7-inch, re-released on  The Machines: 1990-1993 comp. (Simple Machines - SMR 19, 1994)
 1990: "Nothing Is Easy" (live version) on "Pre-Moon Syndrome Post Summer (of Noise) Celebration Week!"
 1993: "Abraham Lincoln" on Simple Machines Working Holiday#2 "Working Holiday Series" split 7-inch (with The Tinklers)
 1993: "Abraham Lincoln" on "The Machines Compilation CD"
 1993: "Abraham Lincoln" on "Echoes from the Nation's Capital (A Washington D.C. Compilation) 1"
 1994: "Abraham Lincoln" on Working Holiday! CD Compilation
 1995: 10 East 3-song 7-inch
 2002: "Friend to Friend in Endtime" on "Dischord 20th Anniversary Compilation"

Related projects: Daniel Higgs
 1998: Cone of Light (as Cone of Light)
 2002: The Pupils (as The Pupils with Asa Osborne)
 2005: Magic Alphabet
 2006: Plays the Mirror of the Apocalypse
 2006: Ancestral Songs
 2007: Atomic Yggdrasil Tarot (book & CD)
 2007: Metempsychotic Melodies
 2009: Devotional Songs of Daniel Higgs (cassette)
 2009: Hymnprovisations for Banjo by the (A.I.U) with Piano & Raindrops
 2010: Say God
 2010: Clairaudience Fellowship (with Twig Harper)
 2011: Peer Amid (with The Skull Defekts)
 2011: 2013–3012 (with The Skull Defekts)
 2011: Ultraterrestrial Harvest Hymns (cassette)
 2011: Beyond & Between
 2012: The Measure of Mystery (cassette)
 2013: The Godward Way
 2014: Dances In Dreams of ihe Known Unknown (with The Skull Defekts)
 2014: Street Metal (with The Skull Defekts)
 2015: VIV (LP)
 2016: The Fools Sermon, Part 1 (LP)
 2016: The Fools Sermon, Part 2 (Cassette)

Zomes (Asa Osbourne + Hanna Olivegren)
 2007: Zomes
 2011: Earth Grid
 2013: Time Was
 2015: Near Unison
 2016: Who Shall Be the Sun
 2018: The First Stone

References

External links
 Dischord's Lungfish page
 Baltimore City Paper feature article
 Daniel Higgs solo performance on 88.1 BSR's Phoning It In
 Daniel Higgs at Arcane Candy

Rock music groups from Maryland
Dischord Records artists
Musical groups established in 1988
Musical groups from Baltimore